"Haunt Me" is a song by English band Sade from their third studio album, Stronger Than Pride (1988). It was released solely in the United Kingdom as the album's fifth and final single.

Reception
Stephen Holden of The New York Times described "Haunt Me" as "a tender, almost abject confession of devotion that seems to waft up from a pillow at high siesta. Sung against a glowing arrangement for classical guitar, piano and strings, Sade offers unconditional love: 'And if you want to sleep/ I'll be quiet/ Like an angel/ As quiet as your soul could be/ If you only knew/ You had a friend like me.'" Frank Guan of Vulture commented, "Piano, guitar, longing, capped off by a sax solo. Take some time to realize how incredible it is that half of Sade's catalogue exceeds a song of this quality."

Track listings
UK 7-inch single
A. "Haunt Me" – 5:48
B. "Make Some Room" – 3:24

UK 12-inch single
A. "Haunt Me" – 5:48
B. "Make Some Room" – 5:00

References

1980s ballads
1988 songs
1989 singles
Epic Records singles
Sade (band) songs
Song recordings produced by Mike Pela
Songs written by Sade (singer)
Songs written by Stuart Matthewman